Ballyregan Bob (12 May 1983 to 3 April 1994) was a racing greyhound who, along with Mick the Miller and Scurlogue Champ, is one of the most revered racing hounds in British greyhound racing. 

Ballyregan Bob was a brindle dog and was whelped in May 1983. Trained by George Curtis he would become world famous for breaking the world record for consecutive race wins.

Racing career
In 1985 Ballyregan Bob won three major events, the Olympic at home track Brighton, the Test at Walthamstow and the Essex Vase at Romford. Whilst winning these events he remained unbeaten and was on his way to setting the world record.
He also qualified for the final of the classic race the St Leger at Wembley but was a non runner in the final.

Wins and track records continued to come his way in 1986 until on 9 December he lined up for the Racing Post Challenge at Brighton and duly broke the world record held by American greyhound Joe Dump by winning his 32nd consecutive race.

Retirement and death
After retirement Bob was put to stud and sired many litters. In 1990 he returned from the United States where he had undertaken stud duties and was sent to Germany where he stood with breeder Franz Joseph Gillett, before eventually returning to Britain.

Ballyregan Bob has the unique distinction of being the only dog ever nominated as Guest of Honour at the commissioning of Royal Navy warship HMS Pursuer - an accolade awarded because of the depiction of a greyhound in the ship's badge. 

After his death of old age in 1994, the greyhound was exhibited in the Natural History Museum at Tring along with Mick the Miller.

World record

Pedigree

See also
 List of individual dogs

References

Greyhound racing in the United Kingdom
1994 animal deaths
Racing greyhounds
1983 animal births